Lay Dam is a hydroelectric power dam on the Coosa River in Chilton County and Coosa County, near Clanton, Alabama.

The concrete run-of-the-river gravity dam was built in 1914 as the first major project of Alabama Power Company, and named for Captain William Patrick Lay, its first president.

The construction of the dam flooded the original site of Fort Williams, which was used during the Creek War.

Lay Lake
It is a recreational lake with fishing opportunities for large mouth bass, spotted bass, bluegill and other sunfish, crappie, catfish, striped bass, hybrid and white bass. Lay Lake has hosted the Bassmaster Classic four times: 1996, 2002, 2007, and 2010. Alabama Power maintains seven public access sites on the lake.

References 

Dams in Alabama
Alabama Power dams
Buildings and structures in Chilton County, Alabama
Buildings and structures in Coosa County, Alabama
Properties on the Alabama Register of Landmarks and Heritage
Run-of-the-river power stations
Hydroelectric power plants in Alabama
Gravity dams
Dams completed in 1914
Energy infrastructure completed in 1914